The Aars stone or DR 131 is a late Viking Age runestone located on a mound in the churchyard at Aars in Himmerland, Denmark. Dated to the late 10th to early 11th century, it bears an inscription in the Younger Fuþark in memory of Toke Gormsson, known as Valtoke, who died at the Battle of Fýrisvellir.

Description
It is inscribed on both sides, and decorated with semicircles inside the text band and a "U" shape above the text on the front. It is dated to between 970 and 1020.First described by J. Meier in 1654, it was lying face-down in the churchyard; in 1838  examined it and discovered the inscription on the front. In the 1920s it was re-erected on a mound west of the south transept. It is believed to have originally stood north-east of the church, probably as part of a memorial assemblage comparable to the Jelling stones.

The inscription on the back includes alliteration that may be formulaic.

Inscription

Transliteration of runes
Front: ąsur : sati : stin : þąnsi : aft : ual:tuka : trutin : | : sin
Back: stin : kuask : hirsi : stąnta : ląki : saR : ual:tuka : | : uarþa : nafni

Transcription into Old Norse
Front: Assurr satti stēn þannsi æft Val-Tōka, drōttin sinn.
Back: Stēnn kvæðsk hērsi standa længi, sāR Val-Tōka varða næfni.

Translation into English
Front: Ǫzurr placed this stone in memory of Valtóki, his lord.
Back: The stone proclaims that it will long stand here; it will name Valtóki's cairn.

Valtoke, or Wal-Tóki, was Toke Gormsson, a son of the Danish king Gorm the Old. He died fighting against the Swedish king Eric the Victorious in the Battle of Fýrisvellir near Uppsala; Danish Runic Inscription 295, one of the Hällestad Runestones, also commemorates his death.

References

External links
 

11th-century inscriptions
Runestones in Denmark
Himmerland